Tabbles is a file-tagging application and relational file manager for Windows which is used to organize contents. It can tag any file type in any file system locally or over a network. 

The name "Tabbles" is portmanteau of tag and bubbles.

Overview 
Tabbles generates in real-time a tag-based relational file system, where tags can be accessed as folders or used as keywords for search. Unlike Windows tagging system, it supports any kind of files and documents on local and shared drives, as well as many cloud storage or file synchronization systems like Dropbox. Tabbles allows users to collaboratively tag files on network drives, through group and user policy management.

Data management model 
Tabbles implements a relational approach to file and data management, as an extension to the traditional file management being hierarchically structured, similar to Microsoft's WinFS. Files, emails and bookmarks are categorized by labeling them with tags, instead of placing them in hierarchical folders or containers. The data is then browsed, sorted and retrieved by navigating and searching through tags, or combination of tags. Tags are visualised and browsed as virtual folders. A relational file system is generated dynamically, independently from the physical location of the data. This allows for files or emails physically stored in different folders or machines, to be grouped and browsed together at once.

Technology 
Tabbles was among the first commercial software developed in F# and WPF, and was featured on  F# creator's blog. It has a client-server architecture, requires a Microsoft SQL Server to run and relies on stored procedures for the core logic and the security management. Tabbles is tightly integrated with Windows and Windows Explorer using several APIs: FileSystemWatcher, IFileOperationProgressSync, Overlay Handlers, ContextMenu Handlers, Win32 API, Office interop, Outlook interop. It uses VSTO to integrate into Microsoft Outlook.

Features 
 Tagging files in local folders, network drives, removable drives, optical disks 
 Auto-tagging files and folders, local and remote, based on user defined rules 
 Tagging files from the application's GUI, Windows Explorer, from 3rd party file managers, from command line and via APIs 
 Tags on files and folders managed by file synchronization tools (such as Dropbox) are synchronized 
 User and groups privileges for tagging on shared folder and network drives 
 Graphically browse through single tags or combinations, as if in virtual folders 
 Tag emails (in Microsoft Outlook) and bookmarks 
 Administrator management window for user and groups creation and management

In the media 

Tabbles received multiple reviews, among others from the Washington Post, Lifehacker, Chip and several paper magazines. Reviews were typically mildly positive and focused on the innovative side of the application.

See also 

 Virtual folder
 Windows Explorer
 WinFS

References

External links 
 

File managers for Microsoft Windows
Windows file-tagging software
2009 software